Fine & Mellow Productions  is a production company based in Copenhagen, Denmark. It is owned by Thomas Gammelgaard (66%) and Nordisk Film (34%), and produces both feature films and television drama.

History 
Fine & Mellow Productions  was founded in 2002 by Thomas Gammeltoft, former producer and co-owner of Angel Production. The company's first feature film, Stealing Rembrandt (2003) sold over a quarter of a million tickets in its first week. Later successes include Hella Joof's comedy Oh Happy Day (2004) which was sold to Disney for a US remake and Henrik Ruben Genz's Terribly Happy which won both the Bodil Award and Robert Award for Best Danish Film of 2008.

Productions

Feature films 
 Stealing Rembrandt (Jannik Johansen, 2003)
 Oh Happy Day (Hella Joof, 2004)
 Chinaman (Henrik Ruben Genz, 2005)
 Murk (Jannik Johansen, 2005)
 Pure Hearts (Kenneth Kainz, 2006)
 Easy Skanking (Hella Joof, 2006)
 Terribly Happy (Henrik Ruben Genz, 2008)
 Hush Little Baby (Hella Joof, 2009)
 Rosa Morena (Carlos Augusto de Oliveira, 2011)
 Skyscraper (Rune Schjøtt, 2011)
 Excuse Me (Henrik Ruben Genz, 2012)
 Volcano'' (Runar Runarsson, 2012)

Television 
 Lulu & Leon

References

External links 
 Official website
 Fine & Mellow Productions on IMDB
 

Mass media companies of Denmark
Film production companies of Denmark
Television production companies of Denmark
Mass media companies based in Copenhagen
Mass media companies established in 2002
2002 establishments in Denmark
Companies based in Copenhagen Municipality